Anna Stöhr (born 25 April 1988 in Reith im Alpbachtal, Austria) is a professional climber. She is a champion in bouldering climbing competitions. She won four Bouldering World Cups, in 2008, 2011, 2012 and 2013 and two World Championships, in 2007 and 2011. Notably, she dominated the 2013 Bouldering World Cup series, by winning seven events out of eight, losing one just by one attempt to Juliane Wurm.

Biography
Stöhr started climbing with her parents when she was a child.

In 2002, she started competing in the youth speed, lead and bouldering disciplines. In 2002, she won the silver medal in speed Youth B at the World Youth Championship in Canteleu, France. From 2002 to 2005 she competed in the European Youth Cup in lead, taking the third place in 2002, the second place in 2003, the fourth place in 2004 and the first place in 2005.

In 2004, at age sixteen, she started to compete in the senior categories. In 2004 and 2005 she competed in both lead and bouldering World Cup, and starting in 2006 she focused only on bouldering, where she achieved her greatest success. Her first podium came in 2005 in Moscow and her first victory in 2006 in Grindelwald. In 2007, she won her first World Championship title, in Avilés, Spain, and in 2008 her first Bouldering World Cup title.

In 2018, in Magic Wood in Switzerland, Stöhr achieved her highest grade on natural rock, with the ascent of New Base Line (V14/8B+). In 2010, she climbed The Riverbed, the second-ever female ascent of an   boulder in history, after Angie Payne in August 2010.

In 2011, Stohr won both the World Championship in Arco, Italia, and the World Cup title.  In 2012, she won her third World Cup Title and in 2013 her fourth title, winning seven events out of eight.

Rankings

Climbing World Cup

Climbing World Championships

Climbing European Championships

Number of medals in the Climbing World Cup

Bouldering

See also
List of grade milestones in rock climbing
History of rock climbing
Rankings of most career IFSC gold medals

References

External links

 
 

Austrian rock climbers
Living people
1988 births
Female climbers
20th-century Austrian women
21st-century Austrian women
IFSC Climbing World Championships medalists
IFSC Climbing World Cup overall medalists
Boulder climbers